TechStyle Fashion Group, formerly JustFab Inc., is an online, membership  fashion retailer that has a portfolio of five direct-to-consumer brands including JustFab, FabKids, ShoeDazzle, Savage X Fenty, and Fabletics. Its brands carries selections of shoes, handbags, jewelry, lingerie, activewear, and denim. It offers a personalized shopping experience based on members' indicated fashion preferences. As of 2019 the company has over 5 million paying VIP members, earning revenues of $800 million.

History

TechStyle Fashion Group, originally operating under the name JustFab, company was founded by Don Ressler and Adam Goldenberg in March 2010. Its portfolio of brands collaborate with celebrities and influencers to build  capsules that resonate with their consumer base. In recent years, TechStyle Fashion Group's brands have collaborated with Demi Lovato, Kelly Rowland, Maddie Ziegler, Rita Ora, and Normani. 

In August 2019, TechStyle Fashion Appointed former Chief Media Officer Laura Joukovski to the company’s new President of Global Fashion Brands. In February 2020, TechStyle Fashion Group announced the appointment of Meera Bhatia as President of Expert Services.

In August 2020, TechStyle Fashion Group partnered with philanthropy, Good360. JustFab and ShoeDazzle donated $1.5 million worth of clothing apparel with the purpose to lessen  excess inventory waste.

JustFab

In August 2016, the company was officially rebranded from JustFab, Inc. to TechStyle Fashion Group. JustFab was  spun out as one of the company’s brands under the TechStyle collection of brands. A television show about TechStyle brand JustFab and Simmons titled "Kimora: House of Fab" premiered on the Style Network in January 2013. The show covered daily life at the JustFab offices, Simmons’ role as president and creative director, and the duties of the company's marketing, merchandising, and public relations departments.

JustFab continued international expansion into Spain and France after acquiring The Fab Shoes in May 2013.

In 2016, JustFab launched an "all size" campaign to promote that it's ready-to-wear collection would now include sizes XS to 3X, 24-34 and 16W- 24W.

In August 2017 JustFab was issued an ASA ban for luring customers into a subscription via a promotion on its website. 

In November 2019, TechStyle appointed Daria Burke as Chief Marketing Officer of JustFab. 

In 2020, JustFab was included on  Elite Daily’s list of plus-sized brands to try. In July 2020, TechStyle Fashion Group Named Nina Fuhrman Chief Merchant for JustFab and ShoeDazzle. Singer Kelly Rowland produced a capsule for office clothing and lounge wear through JustFab in 2020.

FabKids
In January 2013, TechStyle, then JustFab, acquired children's fashion-subscription company FabKids. Despite the similarity in their names, there was no previous association between the two companies. In September 2020,  Entertainment Tonight Online named FabKids on a list of the best kids shoes on the market.

Shoedazzle

TechStyle (then JustFab) acquired rival shoe subscription service ShoeDazzle in August 2013, but the two companies continued to run as separate brands. In July 2020 ShoeDazzle was recognized by Forbes for its personalized loyalty program following collaborations with Jessie James Decker, Erika Jane, Porsha Williams and Aliya Janell.

Fabletics

Fabletics, an online athletic wear retailer, was founded by Adam Goldenberg, Don Ressler and Kate Hudson in July 2013. In 2015, Fabletics was TechStyle's fastest growing label. 

In April 2019, Fabletics expanded to brick and mortar retail with its first store in Soho, Manhattan. Fabletics has opened 50 North American stores with eight of these locations opened after COVID-19 restrictions lifted in June 2020. In April 2020, Fabletics expanded to menswear, signing Kevin Hart as an investor and the face of the new brand.

Savage X Fenty

In May 2018, TechStyle partnered with Rihanna to launch Savage X Fenty, a lingerie, sleepwear, and accessories brand for women and men. The original launch in 2018 included four  capsule collections in the main line, and the brand expanded and launched numerous capsules, often with celebrity partners Normani and Lizzo. Associated with  diversity and body-positive messaging, Savage X Fenty bras are available from a 32A to 44DD, with lingerie, undies, and loungewear coming in sizes from XS to 3XL. Savage x Fenty has also made headline news for the last three consecutive years during New York Fashion Week, with the brand’s fashion shows frequently being dubbed as a highlight of the week. 
In March 2020, Fast Company named Savage x Fenty one of the 10 most innovative style companies of 2020, alongside brands such as Madewell and Levi Strauss & Co. 
In October 2020, Savage x Fenty launched the brand’s first menswear collection with Christian Combs, which debuted at the 2020 Fashion Show during New York Fashion Week.

Funding
In 2011, TechStyle (operating under the name JustFab) received $33 million in funding from US venture capital firm Matrix Partners. In 2012 the company received an additional $76 million from Matrix Partners, Rho Ventures, Technology Crossover Ventures, and Intelligent Beauty and expanded its operations internationally to Canada, Germany, and the UK.

In September 2013, TechStyle's CEOs Adam Goldenberg and Don Ressler announced that the company closed $40 million in its third round of funding to accelerate its already-fast international growth and enter new product categories.

In August 2014, TechStyle (then called JustFab) closed an additional round of funding for $85 million which was led by Passport Special Opportunity Fund and included participation from existing investors Shining Capital, Matrix Partners, and Technology Crossover Ventures. The additional round of funding brought the company's total capitalization to $250 million.

Membership
TechStyle’s Fashion Group operates a membership model — a subscription-like offering in which consumers are offered the opportunity to become members to one or more of the TechStyle brands to get discounted prices and other perks, such as exclusive clothing items. Member prices fluctuate across brands. Members of JustFab, Shoedazzle, and Fabkids pay $39.95 per month while members of Fabletics and Savage pay $49.95 per month. The registration process requires members to complete a survey regarding their fashion preferences. At the beginning of each month, a member can choose one of the selections, request new options, or skip the month altogether without charge.

In February 2019, TechStyle reached more than 5-million members.

References 

Online clothing retailers of the United States
Subscription services
Retail companies based in California
Companies based in Los Angeles
American companies established in 2010
Clothing companies established in 2010
Retail companies established in 2010
2010 establishments in California
Clothing brands of the United States